Trevor Franklin (born June 2, 1957) is a retired English-American professional soccer defender. 

Franklin attended Keene State College, where he was a 1977 and 1978 NAIA first team All-American soccer player.  He was inducted into the school's Athletic Hall of Fame in 2002.  In 1979, Franklin began his professional career with the New England Tea Men of the North American Soccer League.  The Tea Men sent him to the Minnesota Kicks during the season.  In 1980, he moved to the Atlanta Chiefs where he played the 1980 outdoor and 1980-1981 indoor season.  In May 1981, the Chiefs sold Franklin's contract to the Washington Diplomats.  Franklin then played for the Cleveland Force during the 1981-1982 Major Indoor Soccer League season.  He ended his career in the American Soccer League, playing the 1982 and 1983 seasons with the Detroit Express.

References

External links
NASL/MISL stats
Driving in the fast lane

American soccer players
American Soccer League (1933–1983) players
Atlanta Chiefs players
Cleveland Force (original MISL) players
Detroit Express (1981–1983) players
Major Indoor Soccer League (1978–1992) players
Minnesota Kicks players
North American Soccer League (1968–1984) indoor players
North American Soccer League (1968–1984) players
New England Tea Men players
Washington Diplomats (NASL) players
1957 births
Living people
Association football defenders